{{DISPLAYTITLE:C19H28O5S}}
The molecular formula C19H28O5S (molar mass: 368.488 g/mol) may refer to:

 Dehydroepiandrosterone sulfate, or DHEA-S
 Testosterone sulfate

Molecular formulas